Up for the Cup is a 1931 British comedy film directed by Jack Raymond and starring Sydney Howard, Joan Wyndham, Stanley Kirk and Moore Marriott. The screenplay concerns a man who comes to London to watch the FA Cup final.

The film was remade in 1950, again directed by Jack Raymond.

Premise
A Yorkshireman comes to London to watch the FA Cup final and loses his money and tickets, leading to a frantic search to recover them.

Cast
 Sydney Howard as John Willie Entwhistle
  Joan Wyndham as Mary Murgatroyd
 Stanley Kirk as Cyril Hardcastle
 Sam Livesey as  John Cartwright
 Marie Wright as Mrs Entwhistle
 Moore Marriott as James Hardcastle
 Hal Gordon as Proprietor
 Herbert Woodward as Tom
 Jack Raymond as Railway clerk

Critical reception
TV Guide called it "a pleasant comedy."

References

External links
Up for the Cup (1931) at IMDB

1931 films
British sports comedy films
1930s English-language films
Films directed by Jack Raymond
Films set in London
British black-and-white films
British and Dominions Studios films
Films shot at Imperial Studios, Elstree
1930s sports comedy films
1931 comedy films
1930s British films